This is a list of private and public art galleries, centres and collections on the island of Ireland arranged by county and city/town.

County Antrim

Belfast
Catalyst Arts
Crescent Arts Centre
Ormeau Baths Gallery
Ulster Museum

County Cork

Cork City
Crawford Municipal Art Gallery
Lewis Glucksman Gallery

Cobh
Sirius Art Centre

County Donegal

Letterkenny
Letterkenny Regional Cultural Centre

County Dublin

Dublin City
City Arts Centre
Irish Museum of Modern Art (IMMA)
National Gallery of Ireland
Project Arts Centre
Hugh Lane Municipal Gallery
Douglas Hyde Gallery
Royal Hibernian Academy (RHA)
Temple Bar Gallery and Studios
Molesworth Gallery
Kerlin Gallery
Taylor Galleries
Pallas Projects/Studios

County Galway

Galway City
126 Artist-run Gallery

County Kildare

Newbridge
Riverbank Arts Centre

County Kilkenny

Kilkenny City
Butler Gallery

County Limerick

Limerick City
Limerick City Gallery of Art
Hunt Museum
Ormston House

County Londonderry

Derry City
Centre for Contemporary Art Derry~Londonderry

County Sligo

County Sligo
Model Arts and Niland Gallery

County Waterford

Waterford City
 Waterford Gallery of Art

County Westmeath

Athlone
 Luan Gallery

County Wexford

Wexford
 Wexford Arts Centre

International
Irish Arts Centre, New York
Centre Culturel Irlandais, Paris

Major collections 
Arts Council of Northern Ireland
Arts Council of Ireland
Office of Public Works

External links 
Visual Artists Ireland map of galleries
Dublin Gallery Map

Ireland